Roderic Quirk is an Emeritus University of Akron professor noted for contributions to anionic polymerization technology that is used to produce butadiene, isoprene and styrene homo and block copolymers.

Education

 1963 – BS Chemistry, Rensselaer Polytechnic Institute
 1965 – Ph.D. Organic Chemistry under advisor Prof. David Curtin at the University of Illinois
 1967 – postdoc at University of Pittsburgh under Edward Arnett
 1974 - held a summer job at Phillips Petroleum in Henry Hsieh's anionic polymerization lab

Notable Students 
 Frederick Ignatz-Hoover - Eastman technology fellow and 9th editor of Rubber Chemistry and Technology

Awards
 2019 – Charles Goodyear Medal of the Rubber Division of the American Chemical Society
 2019 – National Academy of Inventors

References

Polymer scientists and engineers

Living people
Year of birth missing (living people)
University of Akron faculty